The Eyes of Texas is a long-running regional television series which aired original episodes from 1969 to 1999. The program focused on unique people, events, and places throughout the state of Texas. It was produced and syndicated by KPRC-TV and Stonefilms, both in Houston. The series won a number of awards and produced a number of travel guides covering the state, intertwining notable locations featured in the program with the usual tourist attractions.

Hosts

The first host, KPRC news director Ray Miller (1919–2008), created the show and nurtured it through the early years. The Eyes of Texas evolved into a weekly celebration of Texas culture, history, and people. After Miller retired in 1979, KPRC anchor Ron Stone, whose production company syndicates the series, took over as host.

Beginning in 2007, KPRC presented several "Best of" programs featuring memorable stories aired during the course of the original run, interspersed with recent pieces on various events and places in the style of the original series. These episodes were aired periodically and were hosted at the time by co-anchors Bill Balleza and Dominique Sachse.

In October 2018, The Eyes of Texas was rebooted as a podcast hosted by KPRC reporter Brandon Walker.

Travel guides

These travel guides, all containing text by Miller and photographs by Gary James (and others), were published in Houston by Cordovan Corporation:
 
 
 
 
 
 
Second editions of the guides were published in the late 1980s by Lone Star Press.

References

External links
KPRC-TV: The Eyes of Texas Returns
Stonefilms Website
Eyes of Texas television show episodes and summaries collection, Woodson Research Center, Rice University.
Videos clips from The Eyes of Texas on the Texas Archive of the Moving Image

1969 American television series debuts
1999 American television series endings
1970s American television series
1980s American television series
First-run syndicated television programs in the United States
Television shows filmed in Texas
Television shows set in Texas